Suffolk Cemetery is a Commonwealth War Graves Commission (CWGC) burial ground for the dead of the First World War located in Kemmel in the Ypres Salient on the Western Front.

The cemetery grounds were assigned to the United Kingdom in perpetuity by King Albert I of Belgium in recognition of the sacrifices made by the British Empire in the defence and liberation of Belgium during the war.

Foundation
The cemetery was founded by Commonwealth troops in March and April 1915. It was then disused, except for one 1917 burial, until October 1918.

The cemetery was founded under the name "Cheapside Cemetery" by the Suffolk Regiment. The October 1918 burials were of soldiers from the York and Lancaster Regiment who had been killed the previous April.

The cemetery was designed by J R Truelove who also worked on the Tyne Cot memorial to the missing.

References

External links
 
 

1915 establishments in Belgium
Commonwealth War Graves Commission cemeteries in Belgium
Heuvelland
Cemeteries and memorials in West Flanders